John Langston Kuempel (born May 11, 1970) is an American politician. He has represented the 44th District in the Texas House of Representatives since winning a special election in December 2010. Kuempel is a member of the Republican Party. Kuempel's father, Edmund Kuempel, held the 44th District seat from 1983 until his death in 2010.

References

External links
 Campaign website
 State legislative page

1970 births
Living people
Republican Party members of the Texas House of Representatives
21st-century American politicians
University of Texas at Austin alumni
People from Seguin, Texas